Alessandro Giannelli (born 9 August 1963) is an Italian former racing cyclist. He rode in three editions of the Tour de France, two editions of the Vuelta a España, and five editions of the Giro d'Italia.

Major results
1991
 2nd Coppa Bernocchi
 8th Tre Valli Varesine
1992
 1st Giro del Friuli
 1st Stage 4 Clásico RCN

Grand Tour general classification results timeline

References

External links
 

1963 births
Living people
Italian male cyclists
Sportspeople from the Province of Lucca
Cyclists from Tuscany